Giovanni Paolo Gibertini, O.S.B.  (4 May 1922 – 3 April 2020) was an Italian prelate of Catholic Church who was Bishop of Ales-Terralba from 1983 to 1989 and then Reggio Emilia-Guastalla from 1989 to 1998.

Biography 
Gibertini was born in Ciano d'Enza and ordained a priest on 12 August 1945 for the Order of Saint Benedict. He was appointed bishop of the Ales-Terralba on 23 March 1983 and ordained bishop on 25 April 1983. He was appointed bishop of the Diocese of Reggio Emilia-Guastalla on 11 June 1989 and retired on 27 June 1998. Gilbertini died on 3 April 2020 in Montecchio Emilia at the age of 97.

References

External links
Catholic-Hierarchy
Diocese of Reggio Emilia-Guastalla (Italian)

1922 births
2020 deaths
20th-century Italian Roman Catholic bishops
Italian Benedictines
Benedictine bishops
People from the Province of Reggio Emilia